Protest events and episodes of civil disorder have occurred throughout the history of the Minneapolis–Saint Paul metropolitan area in the U.S. state of Minnesota. This list includes notable instances of civil unrest in the cities of Minneapolis or Saint Paul.

Events

1930s
Arthur and Edith Lee House 1931 race riot 3,000 strong sparked by a black family buying a house in a white neighborhood
Minneapolis general strike of 1934
Bloody Friday (Minneapolis) incident killing two striking truck drivers on July 20, 1934

1960s
1967 Minneapolis Riot, part of the “long, hot summer” events about racism and police brutality

1970s
Women's Strike for Equality in Minneapolis and elsewhere in 1970
Twin Cities Pride parade that began as a protest march in 1972

2000s
Experimental College of the Twin Cities that was a continuation of a campus workers strike and protests in 2006
2008 Republican National Convention held in St. Paul and related protests

2010s
Occupy Minnesota protests in 2011-2012
Killing of Jamar Clark by a Minneapolis police officer in 2015 and the aftermath
Killing of Philando Castile by a St. Anthony police officer in 2016 and the aftermath
Killing of Justine Damond by a Minneapolis police officer in 2017 and the aftermath
Dakota Access Pipeline protests and actions of solidarity in St. Paul and Minneapolis in 2016-2017
U.S. national anthem protests (2016–present) where members of the Los Angeles Sparks walked off the court before Game 1 of WNBA finals in Minneapolis in 2017
2017 May Day protests in Minneapolis and elsewhere

2020s
Protests of government COVID-19 mitigation measures in St. Paul and elsewhere in 2020
George Floyd protests in Minneapolis–Saint Paul after he was murdered by a police officer on May 25, 2020
2020–2023 Minneapolis–Saint Paul racial unrest was prolonged series of protests following Floyd's murder
George Floyd Square occupied protest in 2020, 2021, and 2022
2020 Minneapolis false rumors riot was in reaction to the suicide of a homicide suspect on August 26
Protests over the killing of Dolal Idd by a Minneapolis police officer on December 30, 2020
Daunte Wright protests in Brooklyn Center, Minneapolis, and St. Paul that began on April 11, 2021
Protests in Minneapolis regarding the trial of Derek Chauvin in 2021
2021 Uptown Minneapolis unrest following the killings of Winston Boogie Smith and Deona M. Knajdek in June
Stop Line 3 protests in 2021
Protests over the killing of Amir Locke by a Minneapolis police officer on February 2, 2022

See also
List of killings by law enforcement officers in Minnesota
List of incidents of civil unrest in the United States
Timeline of race relations and policing in Minneapolis–Saint Paul

Protests in the United States
Riots and civil disorder in Minnesota
Lists of events in the United States
History of Saint Paul, Minnesota
History of Minneapolis